Dead Space is a 2023 survival horror video game developed by Motive Studio and published by Electronic Arts. A remake of the 2008 game of the same name developed by EA Redwood Shores, it was released on January 27, 2023, for PlayStation 5, Windows, and Xbox Series X/S. It is the first release in the Dead Space series since 2013's Dead Space 3. The game received generally favorable reviews from critics, with general praise for its improvements to the original.

Gameplay 
Dead Space features various changes from the original game.  Unlike the original in which he was a silent protagonist,  Isaac now has voice lines of his own.  In addition, previous voice lines and conversations remade for the game were adjusted to include Isaac who will now engage in discussion and even argue with the other characters. The game also features more gore than the original, introducing a "peeling" system in which the player can tear and destroy the bodies of the Necromorphs.  Various weapons are more suitable for severing limbs, while others are more suitable for completely destroying bodies.  The remake also improves on the zero gravity element of the original, providing Isaac with thrusters to freely move across designated areas of the Ishimura.

Synopsis

Setting 
Set in the 26th century, the story follows engineer Isaac Clarke, a crewman on a repair vessel called the USG Kellion assigned to the USG Ishimura, a massive planetary mining ship that has gone silent above the planet Aegis VII. His crew includes computer specialist Kendra Daniels, chief security officer Zach Hammond, and co-pilots and security personnel Cpls. Hailey Johnston and Aiden Chen. 

While investigating a distress call sent by the ship's medical officer and Isaac's girlfriend, Nicole Brennan, the Kellions crew is attacked by creatures made from mutated human corpses called Necromorphs. Isaac is forced to fend for himself as he tries to save his crewmates and learn the truth behind the loss of the Ishimura. Along the way, he encounters several survivors including Nicole, horticulturalist Elizabeth Cross, engineer and Cross's boyfriend Jacob Temple, Ishimura Chief Science Officer Terrence Kyne, and insane scientist Dr. Challus Mercer.

Plot 
The Kellion crew arrives at the outskirts of Aegis VII, but they crash-land aboard the Ishimura due to a docking malfunction. An injured Johnston stays behind as Isaac, Kendra, Hammond, and Chen investigate the seemingly abandoned ship. Necromorphs made from the corpses of the Ishimuras crew attack the group, killing Chen and forcing them to separate. As they battle the undead crew, the trio investigates the Ishimura to repair its damage and find out what caused the outbreak. The situation quickly worsens: Necromorphs kill Johnston and destroy the Kellion, and a mutated Chen attacks Hammond before being sealed in an escape pod, which Hammond jettisons.

While exploring and repairing the Ishimura, Isaac briefly reunites with Nicole and meets Cross, who is trying to find Temple and kill a giant Necromorph called the Leviathan. Isaac also discovers the presence of the fanatical Church of Unitology, a cult that led to his devout Unitologist mother killing his father and herself, straining his relationship with Nicole, and a large Marker - a mysterious icon of Unitology, which apparently caused the outbreak by inducing psychosis in the planet's colonists and later the Ishimuras crew.  As Isaac, Kendra, and Hammond are tormented by Marker-induced hallucinations, Isaac encounters Mercer, who sends a Necromorph he created to kill him so he can bring the Marker to Earth and cause a phenomenon he calls "Convergence", which will effectively morph the entire population of the planet into necromorphs.

After Isaac launches an SOS beacon into space, a military ship called the USM Valor arrives, but suffers their own outbreak, having picked up Chen's escape pod earlier. The Valor crashes into the Ishimura, and Isaac and Hammond board the former to recover its singularity core for an escape shuttle that Hammond found. Onboard, the two learn that the Valor was not sent to rescue the Ishimura, but to destroy it and kill any survivors. The pair find the core, but Hammond is attacked by Chen and sacrifices himself to kill him with the overloaded core. Isaac retrieves it and narrowly escapes the Valors destruction. Returning to the Ishimura, he encounters Kyne, who convinces Isaac and Kendra that they should return the Marker to Aegis VII to stop the outbreak.

While helping Kyne recover the Marker, Isaac re-encounters Mercer, who kills Temple before he is killed in turn by Necromorph growths. Isaac retrieves the Marker from the growths and loads it on the shuttle, but Kendra murders Kyne and escapes on her own. Kendra explains that she is an agent of EarthGov sent to recover the Marker, which she reveals is the man-made Red Marker - a failed attempt to reverse-engineer the original Black Marker. EarthGov hid the Red Marker on Aegis VII, but the Ishimuras illegal mining operation revealed its presence, triggering the outbreak and forcing EarthGov to cover up the incident. Before she can leave, Isaac and Nicole recall the shuttle and use it to fly to the surface of Aegis VII, though Kendra flees in an escape pod.

Isaac and Nicole successfully return the Red Marker to the planet, but Kendra arrives and steals it back. She reveals that Nicole was dead all along, having committed suicide to avoid becoming a Necromorph, the "Nicole" Isaac was working with is actually Cross, who hallucinated Isaac as Temple, and the Marker manipulated them both to return the Marker to the Hive Mind, an enormous necromorph which telepathically commands the others. Kendra kills a defiant Cross before she is killed by the awakened Hive Mind, which is in turn killed by Isaac. Isaac narrowly escapes Aegis VII as the Ishimuras payload crashes onto its surface. Alone in the escape shuttle, Isaac begins to fly away, but is attacked by a hostile hallucination of Nicole.

In an alternate ending following the New Game+ mode, Isaac discusses "building something new" with his hallucination of Nicole, having covered the shuttle's interior with the Marker's language.

Development 
Games journalist Jeff Grubb of GamesBeat reported that a remake of Dead Space was in development at Motive on July 1, 2021. He speculated that the success of EA's single-player Star Wars Jedi: Fallen Order (2019) and Capcom's remakes of Resident Evil 2 and Resident Evil 3 were instrumental in the publisher's decision to green-light the Dead Space remake.

The game is being developed using EA's proprietary Frostbite engine, which Motive Studios previously used to develop Star Wars: Squadrons and the single-player campaign of Star Wars Battlefront II. The game will retain the same story and structure as the original but feature redesigned assets, character models, and environments. The developers intend to take advantage of SSDs on the ninth generation of consoles to have the game be presented as an "uninterrupted sequence shot", absent of loading screens. Content that was removed from the original game due to technical constraints may also be added. The game will not feature any microtransactions, in contrast to Dead Space 3, where the addition of microtransactions resulted in a negative reception. The art director for the game, Mike Yazijan, previously worked as art director at EA Montreal assisting Visceral Games in developing Dead Space 2.

The original Dead Space was noted for its audio design, and the team are intended to stay true to the original atmosphere while improving and modifying where necessary. Gunner Wright reprises his role as Isaac Clarke, who is fully voiced, like his appearances in Dead Space 2 and Dead Space 3. Tanya Clarke also reprises her role as Nicole Brennan from Dead Space 2. The other cast members include Anthony Alabi as Zach Hammond, Brigitte Kali Canales as Kendra Daniels, and Faran Tahir as Challus Mercer.

Dead Space went gold on December 15. The game's implementation of a rendering technique called variable rate shading (VRS) was criticized. The PC version received a patch on January 31 that added a VRS toggle. Console versions removed the feature completely.

Marketing 
The game was announced at EA's Play Live event on July 22, 2021, accompanied by a teaser trailer, with an initial target release date of late 2022. On March 11, 2022, it was announced that the game was being pushed to early 2023. On October 4, 2022, a gameplay trailer for Dead Space was released, which revealed the game's release date to be January 27, 2023.

Music 
The original musical score by Jason Graves was retained, with new musical elements and cues composed by Trevor Gureckis. Graves had previously worked on the original game trilogy.

Reception 

Dead Space received "generally favorable reviews", according to the review aggregator Metacritic. 

IGN gave the game high acclaim, saying that Motive Studio rejuvenated the sci-fi horror universe "with its stunningly redesigned spaceship, smartly and subtly enhanced story, and spectacularly re-imagined action scenes". The Guardian described it as a streamlined version of Dead Space, making it flow more smoothly and "embrac[ing] the original's taut pacing and powerful forward-momentum." Eurogamer enjoyed the changes to the Ishimura, calling it "persistent and alive", but felt Issac's new voice distracted from the horror. Kotaku disliked the unchanged boss fights describing them as "boring" and "methodical".

Polygon praised the new audio system added to the game, "The sounds of the Ishimura are richly layered - the din of machinery and otherworldly screams are a constant amplifier of fear." They also commented on the development of Isaac as a protagonist, praising the interactions that he has with the rest of the crew for improving the emotional stakes. GameSpot felt that the remake had made only marginal improvements on the 2008 version, but still praised it as "the quintessential way to play one of the survival horror genre's best." The Verge liked the updates to the story and Issac's newly voiced dialogue, writing "Wright imbues the character with an endearing charm that makes him fun not only to protect but also to be around". PC Gamer praised the game for expanding on the original narrative with much more detail, which led them to hope that this effort could be channeled into a legitimate sequel.

Sales 
In the United States, Dead Space was the second best-selling game of January 2023 behind Call of Duty: Modern Warfare II.

Notes

References

External links 
 

2023 video games
2020s horror video games
Dead Space (franchise) games
Electronic Arts games
Frostbite (game engine) games
PlayStation 5 games
Science fiction video games
Single-player video games
Third-person shooters
Video games about religion
Video games developed in Canada
Video game remakes
Video games set in outer space
Video games set in the 26th century
Windows games
Xbox Series X and Series S games
Motive Studio games